Villa Clara may refer to:

Villa Clara Province, Cuba
Villa Clara, Entre Ríos, Argentina
FC Villa Clara, Cuban football club
Villa Clara (volleyball), Cuban volleyball club
Naranjas de Villa Clara, Cuban baseball team
Villa Clara Provincial Museum, Cuban museum